Genistein (C15H10O5) is a naturally occurring compound that structurally belongs to a class of compounds known as isoflavones. It is described as an angiogenesis inhibitor and a phytoestrogen.

It was first isolated in 1899 from the dyer's broom, Genista tinctoria; hence, the chemical name. The compound structure was established in 1926, when it was found to be identical with that of prunetol. It was chemically synthesized in 1928. It has been shown to be the primary secondary metabolite of the Trifolium species and Glycine max L.

Natural occurrences
Isoflavones such as genistein and daidzein are found in a number of plants including lupin, fava beans, soybeans, kudzu, and psoralea being the primary food source, also in the medicinal plants, Flemingia vestita and F. macrophylla,  and coffee.  It can also be found in Maackia amurensis cell cultures.

Biological effects
Besides functioning as an antioxidant and anthelmintic, many isoflavones have been shown to interact with animal and human estrogen receptors, causing effects in the body similar to those caused by the hormone estrogen. Isoflavones also produce non-hormonal effects.

Molecular function
Genistein influences multiple biochemical functions in living cells:

 full agonist of ERβ (EC50 = 7.62 nM) and, to a much lesser extent (~20-fold), full agonist or partial agonist of ERα
 agonist of G protein-coupled estrogen receptor (affinity of 133 nM)
 activation of peroxisome proliferator-activated receptors (PPARs)
 inhibition of several tyrosine kinases
 inhibition of topoisomerase
 inhibition of AAAD
 direct antioxidation with some pro oxidative features
 activation of Nrf2 antioxidative response
 stimulation of autophagy
 inhibition of the mammalian hexose transporter GLUT1
 contraction of several types of smooth muscles
 modulation of CFTR channel, potentiating its opening at low concentration and inhibiting it a higher doses.
 inhibition of cytosine methylation
 inhibition of DNA methyltransferase
 inhibition of the glycine receptor
 inhibition of the nicotinic acetylcholine receptor

Activation of PPARs
Isoflavones genistein and daidzein bind to and transactivate all three PPAR isoforms, α, δ, and γ. For example, membrane-bound PPARγ-binding assay showed that genistein can directly interact with the PPARγ ligand binding domain and has a measurable Ki of 5.7 mM. Gene reporter assays showed that genistein at concentrations between 1 and 100 uM activated PPARs in a dose dependent way in KS483 mesenchymal progenitor cells, breast cancer MCF-7 cells, T47D cells and MDA-MD-231 cells, murine macrophage-like RAW 264.7 cells, endothelial cells and in Hela cells. Several studies have shown that both ERs and PPARs influenced each other and therefore induce differential effects in a dose-dependent way. The final biological effects of genistein are determined by the balance among these pleiotrophic actions.

Tyrosine kinase inhibitor
The main known activity of genistein is tyrosine kinase inhibitor, mostly of epidermal growth factor receptor (EGFR). Tyrosine kinases are less widespread than their ser/thr counterparts but implicated in almost all cell growth and proliferation signal cascades.

Redox-active—not only antioxidant
Genistein may act as direct antioxidant, similar to many other isoflavones, and thus may alleviate damaging effects of free radicals in tissues.

The same molecule of genistein, similar to many other isoflavones, by generation of free radicals poison topoisomerase II, an enzyme important for maintaining DNA stability.

Human cells turn on beneficial, detoxifying Nrf2 factor in response to genistein insult. This pathway may be responsible for observed health maintaining properties of small doses of genistein.

Anthelmintic
The root-tuber peel extract of the leguminous plant Flemingia vestita is the traditional anthelmintic of the Khasi tribes of India. While investigating its anthelmintic activity, genistein was found to be the major isoflavone responsible for the deworming property. Genistein was subsequently demonstrated to be highly effective against intestinal parasites such as the poultry cestode Raillietina echinobothrida, the pork trematode  Fasciolopsis buski, and the sheep liver fluke Fasciola hepatica. It exerts its anthelmintic activity by inhibiting the enzymes of glycolysis and glycogenolysis, and disturbing the Ca2+ homeostasis and NO activity in the parasites. It has also been investigated in human tapeworms such as Echinococcus multilocularis and E. granulosus metacestodes that genistein and its derivatives, Rm6423 and Rm6426, are potent cestocides.

Atherosclerosis
Genistein protects against pro-inflammatory factor-induced vascular endothelial barrier dysfunction and inhibits leukocyte-endothelium interaction, thereby modulating vascular inflammation, a major event in the pathogenesis of atherosclerosis.

Cancer links
Genistein and other isoflavones have been identified as angiogenesis inhibitors, and found to inhibit the uncontrolled cell growth of cancer, most likely by inhibiting the activity of substances in the body that regulate cell division and cell survival (growth factors). Various studies have found that moderate doses of genistein have inhibitory effects on cancers of the prostate, cervix, brain, breast and colon. It has also been shown that genistein makes some cells more sensitive to radio-therapy.; although, timing of phytoestrogen use is also important.

Genistein's chief method of activity is as a tyrosine kinase inhibitor. Tyrosine kinases are less widespread than their ser/thr counterparts but implicated in almost all cell growth and proliferation signal cascades. Inhibition of DNA topoisomerase II also plays an important role in the cytotoxic activity of genistein. The observation that transition of normal lymphocytes from quiescence (G0) to the G1 phase of the cell cycle is particularly sensitive to genistein prompted the authors to suggest that this isoflavone may be potential immunosuppressant. Genistein has been used to selectively target pre B-cells via conjugation with an anti-CD19 antibody.

Studies on rodents have found genistein to be useful in the treatment of leukemia, and that it can be used in combination with certain other antileukemic drugs to improve their efficacy.

Estrogen receptor — more cancer links
Due to its structure similarity to 17β-estradiol (estrogen), genistein can compete with it and bind to estrogen receptors. However, genistein shows much higher affinity toward estrogen receptor β than toward estrogen receptor α.

Data from in vitro and in vivo research confirms that genistein can increase rate of growth of some ER expressing breast cancers. Genistein was found to increase the rate of proliferation of estrogen-dependent breast cancer when not cotreated with an estrogen antagonist. It was also found to decrease efficiency of tamoxifen and letrozole - drugs commonly used in breast cancer therapy. Genistein was found to inhibit immune response towards cancer cells allowing their survival.

Effects in males
Isoflavones can act like estrogen, stimulating development and maintenance of female characteristics, or they can block cells from using cousins of estrogen. In vitro studies have shown genistein to induce apoptosis of testicular cells at certain levels, thus raising concerns about effects it could have on male fertility; however, one study found that isoflavones had "no observable effect on endocrine measurements, testicular volume or semen parameters over the study period." in healthy males given isoflavone supplements daily over a 2-month period.

Carcinogenic and toxic potential
Genistein was, among other flavonoids, found to be a strong topoisomerase inhibitor, similarly to some chemotherapeutic anticancer drugs ex. etoposide and doxorubicin. In high doses it was found to be strongly toxic to normal cells. This effect may be responsible for both anticarcinogenic and carcinogenic potential of the substance. It was found to deteriorate DNA of cultured blood stem cells, which may lead to leukemia. Genistein among other flavonoids is suspected to increase risk of infant leukemia when consumed during pregnancy.

Sanfilippo syndrome treatment
Genistein decreases pathological accumulation of glycosaminoglycans in Sanfilippo syndrome. In vitro animal studies and clinical experiments suggest that the symptoms of the disease may be alleviated by adequate dose of genistein. Genistein was found to also possess toxic properties toward brain cells. Among many pathways stimulated by genistein, autophagy may explain the observed efficiency of the substance as autophagy is significantly impaired in the disease.

Cognition 
A study looking at Italians older than 50 found that those with the highest genistein intake had the lowest odds of cognitive impairment.

Related compounds
 Genistin is the 7-O-beta-D-glucoside of genistein.
 Wighteone can be described as 6-isopentenyl genistein
 KBU2046 under investigation for prostate cancer.
 B43-genistein, an anti-CD19 antibody linked to genistein e.g. for leukemia.

See also
 (S)-Equol
 Liquiritigenin
 Menerba

References

External links

 Compound Summary at NCBI PubChem
 Fact Sheet at Zerobreastcancer 
 Information at Phytochemicals
 Chemical Compound Review at Wikigenes
 Information at Chemicalbook
 Description at SpringerReference
 Description at NCI Drug Dictionary

3α-Hydroxysteroid dehydrogenase inhibitors
21-Hydroxylase inhibitors
Dietary supplements
Flavonoid antioxidants
GPER agonists
Isoflavones
Nutrients
Protein kinase inhibitors
Phytoestrogens
Glycine receptor antagonists
Selective ERβ agonists
Steroid sulfotransferase inhibitors